Tribe Records was an American jazz independent record label which was active during the 1970s and whose artists included Doug Hammond, Marcus Belgrave, Phil Ranelin and Wendell Harrison.

History
Based in Detroit, Michigan, United States, Tribe Records was a collective of local musicians. The group included Wendell Harrison, Phil Ranelin, Marcus Belgrave, Harold McKinney, Roy Brooks, Charles Moore, and Doug Hammond amongst others. Besides the record label,  Tribe held a publishing house for a magazine and a production company under its roof.

Discography

Albums
1973: The Tribe Presents Wendell Harrison & Phillip Ranelin - Message From The Tribe
1973: Wendell Harrison - An Evening With The Devil
1974: Marcus Belgrave - Gemini II
1974: Harold McKinney - Voices And Rhythms Of The Creative Profile
1974: Phil Ranelin - The Time Is Now!
1975: Doug Hammond & David Durrah - Reflections In The Sea Of Nurnen
1975: Phil Ranelin - Vibes From The Tribe
1976: The Mixed Bag - Mixed Bag's First Album

Singles
1973 Wendell Harrison And The Tribe - "Farewell To Welfare Part 1 & 2"
1975 Doug Hammond & David Durrah - "Venus Fly Trap"

See also
 List of record labels

References

External links
Discogs

American record labels
Jazz record labels
Rhythm and blues record labels
Soul music record labels
Experimental music record labels
Blues record labels